Chloroclystis papillosa is a moth in the family Geometridae. It was described by Warren in 1896. It is found in the north-eastern Himalayas.

References

External links

Moths described in 1896
papillosa